Hans Mertens (January 2, 1906 – August 18, 1944) was a German painter associated with the New Objectivity.

Mertens was born in Hanover and had his artistic training there at the School of Arts and Crafts during 1925–26. He found work as a restorer, first in the Provinzialmuseum and then in the Kestner-Museum in Hanover. He was a friend of Carl Buchheister and Kurt Schwitters.

During the 1920s, Mertens painted still lifes, landscapes, and figurative subjects in a controlled style. A Constructivist tendency is visible in his painting Card Players (1926): the imposition of geometric order onto organic forms causes the man's hair part, shirtfront, and cards to align with an edge of a background wall. Still Life with Household Articles (1928) is typical of much New Objectivity painting in its dispassionate rendering of mundane objects.

Mertens remained dependent on work as a commercial artist to make a living. In 1933 he married Hanna Vogel. In 1939 he was called to military service. Many of his works were destroyed when his studio was bombed by Allied forces in 1943. In 1944 Mertens was killed in action at Albi.

Notes

References
 Michalski, Sergiusz (1994). New Objectivity. Cologne: Benedikt Taschen. 
 Schmied, Wieland (1978). Neue Sachlichkeit and German Realism of the Twenties. London: Arts Council of Great Britain. 

1906 births
1944 deaths
People from Hanover
20th-century German painters
20th-century German male artists
German male painters
German military personnel killed in World War II